St. Andrew, Stoke Newington, is a Grade II* listed Anglican parish church on Bethune Road in Stamford Hill (on the border of Stoke Newington), in the London Borough of Hackney, England. The church, which is dedicated to St Andrew, is located at the junction of Bethune Road and Dunsmure Road in London N16.

History

A temporary iron church was established on Manor Road in 1876. On 23 September 1883 the parish of Stoke Newington, St. Andrew was created from parts of the parishes of Saint Mary, Stoke Newington and Saint Thomas, Upper Clapton. It was one of several Hackney parishes listed by Charles Booth on his 1898–99 Poverty Map.

The new parish's church, consecrated on 11 October 1884, was designed by Arthur Blomfield.

The church's records, from 1883 to 1977, are held at the London Metropolitan Archives.

Features
The interior is particularly striking, and features the extensive use of murals, mostly by the Victorian designers Heaton, Butler and Bayne. Most of the murals have been painted directly onto the walls; only those at high level in the chancel are marouflage.  The reredos paintings are on mahogany and portray the Crucifixion and the Apostles. The murals on the walls of the nave depict the life of Jesus from the Annunciation to the Ascension.  Figures from the Old Testament and the New Testament are in the chancel above the string course.

Heaton, Butler and Bayne also designed most of the stained glass in the church's windows. The windows on the south side of the church did not survive damage by a bomb on 18 July 1944, during the Second World War. The east window, dating from 1951, is by the Scottish stained glass artist William Wilson.

The great west window was designed by Burlison and Grylls, largely as a First World War memorial, and was dedicated in 1919. It was rededicated on 15 November 2015 by the Bishop of Stepney, the Rt Revd Adrian Newman, at a celebration marking the completion of the first phase of the ongoing repairs to St Andrew's Church.

The church also includes an unusual First World War memorial listing those from the parish who served and returned. It has been restored and is now hung in its original position at the east end of the north aisle.

The font, designed by Blomfield in alabaster, dates from 1884. Blomfield also designed the pulpit.

The organ is by Walker and Sons.

Current activities
St. Andrew's has a small faithful and diverse congregation.

St. Andrew's received a grant from the Heritage Lottery Fund in 2014 to replace the roofs over the south aisle and south nave. Crumbling stonework and the west window have also been repaired. The chancel and north nave and aisle roofs remain to be done and substantial repairs are also required to the east window.

Services
The church's style of worship is in the Catholic tradition. Parish Eucharist is held on Sundays at 10:30am, followed by tea, coffee and biscuits. Midweek Eucharist is held on Tuesdays at 10am. The church is also open for Morning Prayer at 9.25am on Tuesdays and for Evening Prayer at 6.30pm on Thursdays. The priest in charge is the Revd Charis Enga.

See also
Stoke Newington (parish)

References

External links
Official website
Parish boundary
London churches in photographs: St Andrew, Bethune Road, Stamford Hill
Photograph by Robert McDonald
Church Urban Fund: St. Andrew, Stoke Newington
AIM 25: Saint Andrew, Stoke Newington: Bethune Road, Hackney
British History Online. Stoke Newington: Churches
GENUKI: Hackney Anglican churches in 1890
The National Archives (UK): Saint Andrew, Stoke Newington: Bethune Road, Hackney
Charles Booth Online Archive notebook pages: references to St Andrew, Stoke Newington
Obituary in The Guardian of David Catling (who was in the church choir), 6 January 2015

1883 establishments in England
19th-century Church of England church buildings
Andrew the Apostle
Arthur Blomfield church buildings
Churches completed in 1884
Stoke Newington
Former civil parishes in London
Grade II* listed buildings in the London Borough of Hackney
Grade II* listed churches in London
Stamford Hill
Stoke Newington
World War I memorials in England